The Indigenous Peoples Front of Tripura (IPFT) is a regional political party in Tripura, India. It is a member of the National Democratic Alliance and North-East Democratic Alliance. The party was merged into the Indigenous Nationalist Party of Tripura (INPT) in 2001, However diverged out in 2009. The party is allied with BJP in the 2018 Tripura Legislative Assembly election and won 8 seats out of 9 contested seats. The party got 7.5% of the total votes polled. The BJP got 36 seats and with a total of 44 seats the BJP-IPFT coalition have two-thirds majority at the Legislative Assembly.

History

The IPFT made its political breakthrough in the 2000 Tripura Tribal Areas Autonomous District Council (TTAADC) elections. The militant separatist organization National Liberation Front of Tripura (NLFT) had declared that it would only allow the IPFT to contest the election; in light of a series of assassinations, death threats, and kidnappings, only the Left Front and the IPFT participated. The IPFT ended up winning 17 out of 28 seats, taking a majority on the TTAADC.

The Tripura National Volunteers (TNV), Tripuri nationalist militant group, supported the IPFT in the 2000 elections. In 2001, after pressure from the NLFT, the TNV merged with the Indigenous People's Front of Tripura. In 2002, the Indigenous Nationalist Party of Tripura (INPT) was formed as a merger of the Indigenous People's Front of Tripura and the Tripura Upajati Juba Samiti (TUJS).

The newly formed INPT formed an alliance with the Indian National Congress for the 2003 Tripura Legislative Assembly election, in which the INPT won six assembly seats.

After the 2003 assembly election, 6 District Councilors split away from the INPT to form the National Socialist Party of Tripura (NSPT), under the leadership of Hirendra Tripura and Budhu Kumar Debbarma. The NSPT formed a government in the TTAADC by forming a coalition with the communist CPIM party. Following this, more INPT leaders defected, leaving to join the Indian National Congress.

In 2005, another youth leader and INPT MLA Animesh Debbarma left the party to form the National Conference of Tripura (NCT).

Before the 2009 Loksabha election, some INPT leaders decided to revive the IPFT party under the leadership of former All India Radio Director N.C Debbarma. The main demand of the IPFT is the formation of "Tipraland", a state within the TTAADC, under articles 2 and 3 of the Indian Constitution.

The IPFT contested both of the Loksabha seats of Tripura in 2009, but received very few votes. It also contested 21 out of 28 ADC seats in the 2010 Tripura Tribal Areas Autonomous District Council election, but only received a total of 2,216 votes.

The IPFT also failed to gain a majority in the 2013 Tripura assembly elections, receiving 11,234 votes in 17 contested seats. Following these elections, IPFT leader Patal Kanya Jamatia left and joined the INPT, ultimately leaving again to form the Tripura Peoples Front (TPF).

In the 2015 ADC elections, the IPFT contested 27 of the 28 seats. Despite securing the second-highest number of votes at 115,252, the IPFT was unable to gain a single seat. The IPFT split again following these elections, with some members like Retd. TCS officer  C.R Debbarma & Rangchak Kwthang  leaving to form the Tipraland State Party (TSP). The party was further weakened after some prominent IPFT youth leaders, including David Murasing and Pabitra Jamatia, left the party to join the current ruling party Bharatiya Janata Party (BJP), the party in power nationally in India, on 11 December 2016, but David Murasing  ultimately leaving again  BJP on 16 August 2017 to form Twipra Dophani Sikla Srwngnai Motha (TDSSM).

Splinter Factions
5 factions emerged out of IPFT:
 Indigenous People's Front of Tripura (Tipraha) (IPFT-T) of Aghor Debbarma, Budhu Debbarma, and Binoy Debbarma.
 Indigenous People's Front of Tripura (Balaram Debbarma) (IPFT-B) of Balaram Debbarma.
 Tripura People's Front (TPF) of Patal Kanya Jamatia.
 Tipraland State Party (TSP) of Retired TCS officer C.R Debbarma & Sonacharan Debbarma.
 Twipra Dophani Sikla Srwngnai Motha (TDSSM) of D Hamkhrai Twipra (David Murasing) also split from IPFT.

See also
 Tipraland

References

 
Tripuri nationalism
Political parties established in 1997
1997 establishments in Tripura
Political parties in India
2001 disestablishments in India
Political parties disestablished in 2001
2009 establishments in Tripura
Political parties established in 2009